Goya is a station on Line 2 and Line 4 of the Madrid Metro.

References 

Line 2 (Madrid Metro) stations
Line 4 (Madrid Metro) stations
Railway stations in Spain opened in 1924